Bouzourou is a village in the Fara Department of Balé Province in southern Burkina Faso. The town has a total population of 964.

References

External links
Satellite map at Maplandia.com

Populated places in the Boucle du Mouhoun Region